Hibbertia praestans is a species of flowering plant in the family Dilleniaceae and is endemic to northern parts of the Northern Territory. It is a small, broom-like shrub with red flowers arranged singly or in pairs in leaf axils with four stamens and a single carpel.

Description
Flowering occurs from December to August.

Taxonomy
This species of Hibbertia was first formally described in 1992 by Lyndley Craven and Clyde Robert Dunlop who gave it the name Pachynema praestans in Australian Systematic Botany, from specimens Craven collected near Jabiru in 1973. In 2009, James W. Horn changed the name to Hibbertia praestans. The specific epithet (praestans) means "pre-eminent" or "superior".

Distribution and habitat
This hibbertia grows in sandstone crevices or in open forest on scree slopes in northern parts of the Northern Territory.

Conservation status
Hibbertia praestans is classified as of "least concern" under the Territory Parks and Wildlife Conservation Act 1976.

See also
List of Hibbertia species

References

praestans
Flora of the Northern Territory
Plants described in 1992
Taxa named by Lyndley Craven